Satria Stadium is a sports stadium, used mostly for association football matches and also for athletics, located in Purwokerto, Central Java, Indonesia. The stadium is the home base of Persibas Banyumas.

See also
 List of stadiums by capacity

References

Sports venues in Indonesia
Football venues in Indonesia
Multi-purpose stadiums in Indonesia
Stadiums under construction